Athpare, also known as Athapre, Athpariya, Athpre, Arthare, Arthare-Khesang, or Jamindar , spelled Athpariya I to be distinguished from Belhariya (Athpariya II), is an eastern Kiranti language.

Locations
Athpare spoken by some 5,000 people living in Dhankuta District in eastern Nepal. Athpare is spoken to the north of Tamur, to the west of Dhankuta khola, and to the east of Tangkhuwa, and is also spoken in Dhankuta municipality and Bhirgau VDC.

Phonology
The consonants are shown in the table below. Voiced consonants are rare in the initial position. In the medial position of verbs, voiced consonants are conditioned variants. Aspiration is phonemic in initial position. There are no fricatives except for [s] and [h].

Geminated consonants are found in verbs with stem-final [tt] and as the result assimilation to the infinitival suffix (e.g. -ma: pap(t)- + ma -> pamma ‘scratch’).

Vowel phonemes

There are five vowels in Athpare: /i, e, a, o, u/. Vowels are somewhat lengthened in open root syllables, but are likely allophonic to short vowels. Diphthongs are marginal in Athpare—ai, oi and ui have been shown to exist but in very few words.

Morphology
Subject and object person markers are realized partly as prefixes, partly as suffixes. There are separate number suffixes and tense markers, some of them followed by a copy of the person marker. Periphrastic tense-aspects (perfect and progressive) are fully grammaticalized. Athpare is morphologically ergative, with a split between 1st person and the rest. Minimal use is made of non-finite verb forms: Compound verbs consist of two verbs marked for person and tense, subordinators follow inflected verbs.

Athpare has an extremely complex verbal system, with both actor and undergoer being marked on the verb. There are also several types of suffix copying, resulting in the longest suffix chains of any Kiranti language, e.g.

Word order
Athpare is a verb-final language. Topics and sentence adverbials
normally have initial position. There is much freedom in rearranging
elements according to communicative needs.

Athpare has a number of verbs corresponding to the English ‘be’:
 wa-, wama (locational)
 yuŋ-, yuŋma (existential)
 lis-, lima (be, become - acquisition)
 is-, ima (be, become - spatial)
 le-na (identification)
 NEG: waina~woina

Participants are coded by pronominal affixes on the verb, and if
necessary, by noun phrases Pronouns are optional and used only if the
speaker wants to make the reference more explicit.

The following post-positions serve as case markers:
 /-ŋa/ realized as [-ma],[-na],[-ja] or [-ŋa] oblique: ergative; instrumental; genitive; cause
 /-ŋi/ realized as [-mi],[-ni],[-i]~[-e] or [-ŋi]    locative (and directive)
 -lam(ma)    ablative
 -leŋ    directive
 -lok    comitative
 -me    deprivative

Grammar
Athpare is SOV word order, all modifiers precede their head. It has nine tense-aspect forms: past, non-past, progressive,
ambulative (a progressive form where an activity or process is going
on while the actor or subject is moving here and there), perfect,
negative non-past (negative paradigms don’t directly mirror positive
forms), negative past, a generalized negative and a negative past
anterior/past progressive form - and two modes: imperative and
optative. The two modes are inflected for person, but have no final
tense-aspect markers.

Athpre marks natural gender with kinship terms and for larger animals.
Gender plays no role in agreement. There are two qualitative
classifiers which distinguish human from non-human.

The language has three numbers: singular, dual and plural, and different 1st person inclusive
and exclusive pronouns in dual and plural.

Diminutives are formed from animate nouns with the suffix -cilet.
There are unique temporal adverbs for two, three and four units of
time (days, years, etc.) before and after the present.

References

Sources
Dahal, Dilli Ram. 1985. An ethnographic study of the social change among the Athpariya Rais of Dhankuta. Kathmandu: Tribhuvan University
Ebert, Karen H. 1991. “Inverse and pseudoinverse prefixes in Kiranti languages: Evidence from Belhare, Athpare and Dungmali.” Linguistics of the Tibeto-Burman Area 14/1:73-92
Ebert, Karen H. 1997. A Grammar of Athpare. München / Newcastle: Lincom (LINCOM Studies in Asian Linguistics, 1)
Newpane, Tanka Prasad. 2041. Dhankutako Athpare Raiko bhasik adhyayan. (Unpublished thesis) Kirtipur: Tribhuvan University

Kiranti languages
Languages of Nepal
Languages of Koshi Province